Alanthus may refer to:

 Alanthus, Kansas, United States
 Alanthus, Virginia, United States
 Alanthus Grove, Missouri, United States
 Alanthus Hill, Tennessee, United States